A gubernatorial election was held on 12 April 2015 to elect the Governor of Hokkaido Prefecture.

Candidates
Harumi Takahashi - incumbent governor of Hokkaido, age 61.
, age 65.

Results

References

Hokkaido gubernational elections
2015 elections in Japan